Vembannur is a village located in the Nedumangad taluk of the Thiruvananthapuram District in Kerala, India. Vembannur comes under the Aruvikkara panchayat of the Nedumangad Taluk.

The main attraction of this small village is the Aruvikkara Dam.  This dam was built by the rulers of the Travancore princely state for the supply of drinking water to the city of Thiruvananthapuram. , the water from the dam's reservoir is still in use.  The dam is a small one and it has only 20 feet height.  But stores a good capacity of water.  There is a bridge connecting Vembannur to the outside world in front of the Dam.  A single track bridge, which is the one and only road link to the outer world from this village.

References

Villages in Thiruvananthapuram district